Sir Thomas Dunlop, 1st Baronet  (2 August 1855 – 29 January 1938) was a Scottish businessman.

Life

Dunlop was the eldest son of Thomas Dunlop (1831–1893), a grain merchant and founder of the shipping company, Thomas Dunlop & Sons, and his wife, Robina Jack. He became a senior partner in his father's company and later a director of the Royal Bank of Scotland, Bruce Peebles Ltd and the Scottish Union and National Insurance Company.

In 1914, he became Lord Provost of Glasgow and was created a baronet in 1916 due to this position and appointed a Knight Grand Cross of the Order of the British Empire (GBE) in 1918.

Dunlop is buried with his family in the Glasgow Necropolis. The grave lies on the southern path of the main upper section.

Family

In 1879 Dunlop was married to Dorothy Euphemia Mitchell (1855–1892), daughter of Peter Mitchell of Longniddry. When she died he married her younger sister, Margaret Mitchell (1857–1952).

When he died the baronetcy fell to his eldest son, Thomas Dunlop (1881–1963).

References

Scottish businesspeople
Baronets in the Baronetage of the United Kingdom
Knights Grand Cross of the Order of the British Empire
Lord Provosts of Glasgow
Deputy Lieutenants of Glasgow
1855 births
1938 deaths
Deputy Lieutenants of Lanarkshire
NatWest Group people